"Champagne Supernova" is a song by English rock band Oasis, written by Noel Gallagher. It is the closing track on the band's second studio album, (What's the Story) Morning Glory? (1995), and was released as the sixth and final single from the album in Australia, France, and New Zealand on 13 May 1996. The Jam frontman Paul Weller appears as a guest guitarist and backing vocalist on the track. A music video for the song, directed by Nigel Dick, was released in 1996. The single was not released in the UK.

The song was released in the United States as a radio single, becoming the band's second  1 single on the Modern Rock Tracks chart. It also peaked at No. 20 on the Billboard Hot 100 Airplay, becoming the band's third top 40 single on that chart. The song is included on the band's greatest hits album Stop the Clocks and on the US release of Time Flies... 1994–2009. Supernova SN 2003fg was nicknamed "Champagne Supernova" after the song.

Background
Noel Gallagher claimed in 2005 that he had still not made up his mind as to what the song actually is about, having previously told an NME interviewer in 1995:

In a 2009 interview, Gallagher told the following anecdote:

Critical reception
Steve Baltin from Cash Box declared the song as "another guaranteed smash at all of the same outlets that took “Wonderwall” to the top of the charts. A melodic power ballad, "Champagne Supernova" overflows with the songwriting talents of Noel Gallagher. Oasis is proving time and time again that there isn't another rock act out there that can touch the group as a singles band."

Music video
The accompanying music video for the song was directed by Nigel Dick and was filmed at Ealing Studios on 15 and 16 February 1996.

Live performances
The song was played at the majority of Oasis concerts. Noel Gallagher has stated, "I think it's the only song, since it was written, that we've played every night". During the Morning Glory Tour in 1995/96 and the Be Here Now Tour in 1997/98, the song's ending was usually stretched out by five or so minutes, with Noel playing a long improvised guitar solo. An example of one of these performances can be seen on the DVD ...There and Then.

Oasis performed the song at the 1996 MTV Video Music Awards, with lead vocalist Liam Gallagher making rude gestures at his brother Noel as he was playing his guitar solo and then spitting beer all over the stage before storming off. At Oasis' Knebworth performance, Stone Roses guitarist John Squire made a guest appearance.

After Noel's abrupt departure from Oasis in August 2009 and the band's subsequent dissolution, "Champagne Supernova" became the last original song they performed live together; the last song was a cover of "I Am the Walrus" by the Beatles, as was the case with most of their concerts.

Since Oasis' split, the song has been performed by Noel's follow-up band Noel Gallagher's High Flying Birds, Liam's follow-up band Beady Eye, and Liam during his solo career.

Alternative versions
Brendan Lynch was hired to produce an alternate mix and a remix. The alternate mix was eventually released on the Deluxe Edition of (What's the Story) Morning Glory? while the remix was issued on the B-side on a promo-only 12" of Oasis' cover of Slade's "Cum On Feel the Noize". Known as the "Lynchmob Beats Mix", this remix has been reissued on promotional material for the band's greatest hits album Stop the Clocks.

Live versions of the track were released on ...There and Then and Familiar to Millions. A "clean" version, editing out the waves sound effects at the start of the track, was released on Assorted, a free CD issued with the January 1996 edition of Q magazine. It is also available on the Time Flies... 1994–2009 retrospective collection.

Track listing
 1996 single (US: Epic ESK 7719, SME 11-003393-17, France: Helter Skelter SAMP 3393)
"Champagne Supernova" (radio edit) – 5:08
"Champagne Supernova" (album version) – 7:28

 1996 CD maxi (Australia: SME 663344 1)
"Champagne Supernova" (radio edit) – 5:08
"Champagne Supernova" (album version) – 7:31
"Slide Away" – 6:29

Personnel

Oasis
Liam Gallagher – lead vocals, tambourine
Noel Gallagher – lead guitar, acoustic guitar, e-bow, backing vocals
Paul "Bonehead" Arthurs – rhythm guitar, harmonium, piano
Paul McGuigan – bass guitar
Alan White – drums, percussion

Additional personnel
Paul Weller – lead guitar, backing vocals
Owen Morris – whistle

Charts

Weekly charts

Year-end charts

Certifications

Notable cover versions
 British Eurodance band Urban Cookie Collective did a dance cover of this song but Noel Gallagher prevented them from releasing it as a single.
 American pop rock band OneRepublic released a cover as a stand-alone single in 2017.
 Scala & Kolacny Brothers covered the song in their 2010 album Circle.
 American rapper Machine Gun Kelly and English singer Yungblud released a cover of the song on YouTube in 2020.
 Filipino rock bands Mayonnaise and Suddenly Monday released on 10 October 2019 a collaborated cover of the song which garnered more than 2 million views as of 7 March 2022.

References

External links
 

1990s ballads
1995 songs
1996 singles
British psychedelic rock songs
Music videos directed by Nigel Dick
Oasis (band) songs
Songs about outer space
Rock ballads
Songs about drugs
Songs written by Noel Gallagher